Convoy HX 156 was the 156th of the numbered series of World War II HX convoys of merchant ships from Halifax, Nova Scotia to Liverpool.

The Action

31 October 1941 
The  sighted the convoy at dawn on 31 October 1941, and torpedoed  as the destroyer approached to investigate the Huff-Duff bearing of the sighting report.  A torpedo struck the port side and detonated the forward magazine.  The hull aft of the third stack remained afloat for 5 minutes; and 44 men were rescued from the crew of 159.

Reuben James was the first United States warship sunk during World War II.  U-552 was driven off by the escort; but  found the convoy that afternoon.

1 November 1941 
Task Unit 4.1.3 handed the convoy off to the British 6th Escort Group on 1 November 1941.
U-552 and U-567 made two unsuccessful torpedo attacks on 1 November and maintained contact with the convoy through 3 November.   launched her Hawker Sea Hurricane to intercept a Focke-Wulf Fw 200 Condor aircraft, which it chased off. The Hurricane pilot was rescued by  after ditching his aircraft. The convoy reached Liverpool on 5 November.

Ships in the convoy
These ships were members of Convoy HX 156.

Notes

References 
 
 
 
 

HX156
HX 156
Naval battles of World War II involving Canada